Trechus fischtensis is a species of ground beetle in the subfamily Trechinae. It was described by Edmund Reitter in 1888.

References

fischtensis
Beetles described in 1888
Taxa named by Edmund Reitter